Radomir Mihailović (Serbian Cyrillic: Радомир Михаиловић; born 13 June  1950), also known as Točak (wheel in English) is a Serbian guitarist. He is best known as the guitarist for the Serbian and formerly Yugoslav Smak.

Biography
Mihailović was born on 13th of July, 1950, in Čačak, Serbia, SFR Yugoslavia. He started playing various stringed instruments at 5 years old, to finally commit to the guitar at the age of 9. In his early youth, he was a member of a band from Čačak, called Dečaci sa Morave (Boys from Morava). 

In 1970, he played frequently in various clubs in Belgium. Not long after, in 1971 he forms Smak (eng. Endtime), a rock band from Kragujevac, Serbia, which would become one of the most popular bands in the region, being widely considered as one of the best Yugoslav bands of all time. He is the leading composer and guitarist for the band. Their first full-length album, Smak, was released in 1975. It was a major success, and followed up by what many considered their best record, Crna dama (eng.Black Lady), in 1977. The album was recorded in Morgan Studios, and produced by Martin Levan, a famous London producer, who, among others, worked on Iron Maiden's first album. The English version of the album was also released in 1978, called "Black Lady". These two albums showcased the scope of the band, which had incorporated various musical styles, such as blues, progressive rock, psychedelic rock, jazz rock, and the ethnic music from the region. Mihailović's unique virtuous style of playing is a big part of the band's sound. He plays the electric guitar with fingers, rather than with a pick.  

He recorded a number of solo singles, and published one solo album. He also composed a highly-acclaimed soundtrack for the movie "Byzantine Blue", receiving the Crystal Prysm award.

He runs his own school of guitar in Belgrade.

Discography

Solo

Studio albums
R.M. Točak (ZKP RTLJ, 1976)
Vizantijsko plavo (Vans, 1993)

Live albums
RMTocak trio Live in Skopje `84
RMTocak trio Live in Zagreb `87
TEK Live in Nish 1994

Singles
"Mantilija" / "Specijalka" (Jugodisk 1980)
"Marš..." / "...na Drinu" (PGP RTB 1984)

With Smak

References

 EX YU ROCK enciklopedija 1960-2006,  Janjatović Petar; 
 Nevidljive terazije Slobodana Stojanovića Kepe, Jakovljević Mirko;

External links
 Radomir Mihailović Točak at Progarchives

See also
 Serbian rock
 SFR Yugoslav Pop and Rock scene

1950 births
Living people
Musicians from Čačak
Serbian rock guitarists
Yugoslav musicians
Serbian record producers
Lead guitarists